Events from the year 1927 in art.

Events
 May – Stanley Spencer moves to Burghclere (England) to work on the Sandham Memorial Chapel.
 May 16 – A pair of oval rooms built at the Musée de l'Orangerie in Paris as a permanent home for eight of Monet's water lily paintings is opened by the Government of France.
 June 28 – Unveiling of "The Building of Britain" series of historical paintings by various artists in St Stephen's Hall of the Palace of Westminster in London. Charles Sims' King John confronted by his Barons assembled in force at Runnymede gives unwilling consent to Magna Carta, the foundation of justice and individual freedom in England, 1215 attracts criticism from the press, Members of Parliament and other artists for its idiosyncrasy.
 July 24 – Unveiling of Menin Gate Memorial to the Missing at Ypres, Belgium, designed by Sir Reginald Blomfield.
 September 29 – Unveiling of 107th Infantry Memorial in Central Park, New York City, designed by Karl Illava, a former sergeant in the regiment.
 October – Clarice Cliff begins test marketing her 'Bizarre' pottery decoration in the UK.
 October 4 – Gutzon Borglum begins work on Mount Rushmore National Memorial in the United States.
 November – Ferens Art Gallery in Kingston upon Hull, England, opens.
 date unknown – Aristide Colotte opens his studio in Nancy, France, where he produces glasswork and carved crystal statues.

Exhibitions
 February – Stanley Spencer has his first solo exhibition, at the Goupil Gallery in London.
 April–May – Ben and Winifred Nicholson and Christopher Wood exhibit at the Beaux Arts Gallery in London.
 June 25–July 2 – Federico García Lorca exhibits a series of drawings at the Galeries Dalmau in Barcelona.
 Alice Prin ("Kiki de Montparnasse") has an exhibition of her own paintings at the Galerie au Sacre du Printemps in Paris.

Awards
 Archibald Prize: George W. Lambert – Mrs Murdoch

Works

 Ansel Adams – Parmelian Prints of the High Sierras (photographic portfolio)
 Ernst Barlach – Der schwebende Engel ("The Floating Angel", sculpture (original cast destroyed))
 Edwin Blashfield – Spring Scattering Stars
 Pompeo Coppini – Statue of George Washington (bronze, Portland, Oregon)
 Salvador Dalí – Apparatus and Hand
 Max Ernst
 Forest and Dove
 The Wood
 George Grosz – Self-Portrait, Warning
 Edward Hopper – Automat
 Karl Illava (sculptor) and Rogers and Haneman (architects) – 107th Infantry Memorial, New York City
 Gaston Lachaise – Floating Figure
 Fernand Léger – Nude on a Red Background
 Tamara de Lempicka – La tunique rose
 Will Longstaff – Menin Gate at Midnight
 L. S. Lowry
 Coming Out of School
 Oldfield Road Dwellings, Salford
 Peel Park, Salford
 A View from the Bridge
 René Magritte
 The Enchanted Pose
 Le Jouer Secret (The Secret Player)
 The Menaced Assassin
 The Tiredness of Life
 Henri Matisse – Reclining Nude, Back
 Anne Marie Carl-Nielsen – Equestrian Statue of King Christian IX of Denmark (Christiansborg Palace, Copenhagen)
 Georgia O'Keeffe – Black Abstraction
 Frederick Roth – Equestrian statue of George Washington (bronze, Washington's Headquarters, Morristown, New Jersey)
 Antonio Sciortino – Great Siege Monument
 Lasar Segall – Portrait of Mário de Andrade
 Charles Sheeler – Criss-Crossed Conveyors, River Rouge Plant, Ford Motor Company (photograph)
 Stanley Spencer – The Resurrection, Cookham
 Lajos Tihanyi – Portrait of Tristan Tzara (Hungarian National Gallery)
 Henry Scott Tuke – The Critics
 Alexander Weygers – Mourning (sculpture)
 Rex Whistler – The Expedition in Pursuit of Rare Meats (mural, Tate Gallery restaurant, London)

Births

January to June
 January 1 – Jean-Paul Mousseau, Canadian artist (d.1991)
 January 15 – Olle Zetterquist, Swedish artist
 January 20 – Olivier Strebelle, Belgian sculptor (d.2017)
 January 23 – Fred Williams, Australian painter and printmaker (d. 1982)
 February 3 – Sarah Jiménez, Mexican artist (d. 2017)
 February 14 – Myles Murphy, English painter (d.2016)
 March 5 – Jan Snoeck, Dutch sculptor and ceramist (d. 2018)
 March 13 – Robert Denning, American interior designer (d.2005)
 March 19 – Gisèle Lestrange, French graphic artist (d.1991)
March 31 – David Budd, American abstract painter (d.1991)
 April 6 – Joash Woodrow, English artist (d.2006)
 April 7 – Wolfgang Mattheuer, German painter (d.2004)
 April 15 – David Carritt, English art historian, dealer and critic (d.1982)
 April 16 – John Chamberlain, American sculptor
 April 25 – Albert Uderzo, French comic book artist and scriptwriter (d. 2020)
 May 5 – Eva Fuka, Czech-born photographer
 June 5 — Ladjane Bandeira, Brazilian artist and journalist (d. 1999)
 June 25 – Patricia Martin Bates, Canadian artist
 June 29 
 Dick Martin, American illustrator (d. 1990)
 Kenneth Snelson, American contemporary sculptor and photographer (d. 2016)

July to December
 July 14 – Mike Esposito, American comic book artist (d. 2010)
 July 24
 Alex Katz, American figurative artist
 Robert Rosenblum, American art historian (d. 2006).
 August 8 – Bruno Caruso, Sicilian painter, illustrator, writer, graphic designer and political activist (d. 2018)
 August 23
 Dick Bruna, Dutch illustrator (d. 2017)
 Allan Kaprow, American painter, assemblagist and art theorist (d. 2006)
 August 26 – Ma Jir Bo, Chinese Realist oil painter (d. 1985
 September 22 – Norbert Lynton, British art historian and Professor of the History of Art (d.2007)
 October 3 – Kenojuak Ashevak, Canadian Inuit artist (d. 2013)
 October 4 – Wolf Kahn, German-born painter (d. 2020)
 October 29
 Pierre Alechinsky, Belgian painter, engraver and calligrapher
 Alfred Leslie, American painter and filmmaker
 November 2 – Steve Ditko, American comic book artist (d.2018)
 November 23 – Guy Davenport, American writer, translator, illustrator, painter and teacher (d. 2005)
 December 24 – John Glashan, Scottish cartoonist, illustrator and playwright (d. 1999)
 December 30 – Jan Kubíček, Czech constructivist painter, sculptor (d. 2013)

Deaths

 January 1 – Isabelle de Steiger, painter, theosophist, occultist and writer (b. 1836)
 January 15 – Harald Giersing, painter (b. 1881)
 February 28 – Sir Luke Fildes, painter and illustrator (b. 1843)
 March 23 – Paul César Helleu, portrait painter (b. 1859)
 April 3 – Frederick Morgan, painter (b. c.1850)
 May 10 – Andrea Gram, painter (b. 1853)
 May 11 – Juan Gris, painter (b. 1887)
 May 28 – Boris Kustodiev, painter and stage designer (b. 1878)
 June 26 – Armand Guillaumin, impressionist painter and lithographer (b. 1841)
 June 28 – Otto Bache, painter of historical subjects (b. 1839)
 July 10 – Louise Abbéma, Impressionist painter (b. 1853)
 July 27 – Solomon Joseph Solomon, portrait painter (b. 1860)
 August 4 – Eugène Atget, photographer (b. 1857)
 August 18 – Sascha Schneider, painter and sculptor (b. 1870)
 September 19 – Michael Ancher, painter (b. 1849)
 October 7 – Paul Sérusier, abstract painter (b. 1864)
 October 9 – João Marques de Oliveira, Portuguese painter (b. 1853)
 November 21 – Laurits Tuxen, painter (b. 1853)
 November 25 – József Rippl-Rónai, painter (b. 1861)
 December 13 – Maria Oakey Dewing, American painter (b. 1845)
 date unknown
 Adolphe Demange, portrait painter (b. 1857)
 Caroline Reboux, fashion designer (b. 1837)
 Madame Virot, fashion designer (b. 1826)

See also
 1927 in fine arts of the Soviet Union

References

 
Years of the 20th century in art
1920s in art